In linear algebra,  the transpose of a matrix is an operator which flips a matrix over its diagonal; 

The transpose of a matrix was introduced in 1858 by the British mathematician Arthur Cayley. In the case of a logical matrix representing a binary relation R, the transpose corresponds to the converse relation RT.

Transpose of a matrix

Definition 

Reflect  over its main diagonal (which runs from top-left to bottom-right) to obtain 

If  is an  matrix, then  is an  matrix. 

In the case of square matrices,  may also denote the th power of the matrix .

In this article this confusion is avoided by never using the symbol  as a variable name.

Matrix definitions involving transposition 

A square matrix whose transpose is equal to itself is called a symmetric matrix; that is,  is symmetric if

A square matrix whose transpose is equal to its negative is called a skew-symmetric matrix; that is,  is skew-symmetric if

A square complex matrix whose transpose is equal to the matrix with every entry replaced by its complex conjugate (denoted here with an overline) is called a Hermitian matrix (equivalent to the matrix being equal to its conjugate transpose); that is,  is Hermitian if

A square complex matrix whose transpose is equal to the negation of its complex conjugate is called a skew-Hermitian matrix; that is,  is skew-Hermitian if

A square matrix whose transpose is equal to its inverse is called an orthogonal matrix; that is,  is orthogonal if

A square complex matrix whose transpose is equal to its conjugate inverse is called a unitary matrix; that is,  is unitary if

Examples

Properties 

Let  and  be matrices and  be a scalar.

Products 
Furthermore, these products are symmetric matrices. The entry  is also obtained from these rows, thus , and the product matrix is symmetric. Similarly, the product  is a symmetric matrix.

A quick proof of the symmetry of  results from the fact that it is its own transpose:

Implementation of matrix transposition on computers 

On a computer, one can often avoid explicitly transposing a matrix in memory by simply accessing the same data in a different order. For example, software libraries for linear algebra, such as BLAS, typically provide options to specify that certain matrices are to be interpreted in transposed order to avoid the necessity of data movement.

However, there remain a number of circumstances in which it is necessary or desirable to physically reorder a matrix in memory to its transposed ordering. For example, with a matrix stored in row-major order, the rows of the matrix are contiguous in memory and the columns are discontiguous. If repeated operations need to be performed on the columns, for example in a fast Fourier transform algorithm, transposing the matrix in memory (to make the columns contiguous) may improve performance by increasing memory locality.

Ideally, one might hope to transpose a matrix with minimal additional storage. This leads to the problem of transposing an n × m matrix in-place, with O(1) additional storage or at most storage much less than mn. For n ≠ m, this involves a complicated permutation of the data elements that is non-trivial to implement in-place. Therefore, efficient in-place matrix transposition has been the subject of numerous research publications in computer science, starting in the late 1950s, and several algorithms have been developed.

Transposes of linear maps and bilinear forms 

As the main use of matrices is to represent linear maps between finite-dimensional vector spaces, the transpose is an operation on matrices that may be seen as the representation of some operation on linear maps.

This leads to a much more general definition of the transpose that works on every linear map, even when linear maps cannot be represented by matrices (such as in the case of infinite dimensional vector spaces). In the finite dimensional case, the matrix representing the transpose of a linear map is the transpose of the matrix representing the linear map, independently of the basis choice.

Transpose of a linear map 

Let  denote the algebraic dual space of an -module . 
Let  and  be -modules. 
The following relation characterizes the algebraic adjoint of  
 for all  and 
where  is the natural pairing (i.e. defined by ). 
This definition also applies unchanged to left modules and to vector spaces.

The definition of the transpose may be seen to be independent of any bilinear form on the modules, unlike the adjoint (below).

Transpose of a bilinear form 

Every linear map to the dual space  defines a bilinear form , with the relation . 
By defining the transpose of this bilinear form as the bilinear form  defined by the transpose  i.e. , we find that . 
Here,  is the natural homomorphism  into the double dual.

Adjoint 

The matrix of the adjoint of a map is the transposed matrix only if the bases are orthonormal with respect to their bilinear forms. 
In this context, many authors however, use the term transpose to refer to the adjoint as defined here.

In particular, this allows the orthogonal group over a vector space  with a quadratic form to be defined without reference to matrices (nor the components thereof) as the set of all linear maps  for which the adjoint equals the inverse.

Over a complex vector space, one often works with sesquilinear forms (conjugate-linear in one argument) instead of bilinear forms. 
The Hermitian adjoint of a map between such spaces is defined similarly, and the matrix of the Hermitian adjoint is given by the conjugate transpose matrix if the bases are orthonormal.

See also 

 Adjugate matrix, the transpose of the cofactor matrix
 Conjugate transpose
 Moore–Penrose pseudoinverse
 Projection (linear algebra)

References

Further reading 
 

 .

External links 

 Gilbert Strang (Spring 2010) Linear Algebra from MIT Open Courseware

Matrices
Abstract algebra
Linear algebra